Frost is the second studio album by Norwegian heavy metal band Enslaved. It was released in 1994, through Osmose Productions.

This would be the last album to feature drummer Trym Torson before he joined Emperor.

The band announced that they would play Frost in its entirety at the 2019 Decibel Metal & Beer Fest in Philadelphia, Pennsylvania.

Layout 
The photo on the front cover was taken by Svein Grønvold and appeared in the book Jotunheimen, published by Gyldendal Forlag in 1991.

Track listing

Critical reception 

AllMusic called the album "an important release for the extreme music subgenre of Viking metal", and also a "sizeable creative leap" for the band.

Personnel 
 Enslaved

 Grutle Kjellson – vocals, bass guitar, harmonica, arrangement, production, mixing
 Ivar Bjørnson – lead and rhythm guitar, keyboards, electronics, arrangement, production, mixing
 Trym Torson – drums, percussion, arrangement, production, mixing

 Additional personnel

 Pytten – fretless bass guitar on "Yggdrasil", production, mixing, recording, engineering
 David Bertolini – recording, engineering

References 

Enslaved (band) albums
1994 albums
Relapse Records albums
Season of Mist albums
Osmose Productions albums